The Kaniadakis Generalized Gamma distribution (or κ-Generalized Gamma distribution) is a four-parameter family of continuous statistical distributions, supported on a semi-infinite interval [0,∞), which arising from the Kaniadakis statistics. It is one example of a Kaniadakis distribution. The κ-Gamma is a deformation of the Generalized Gamma distribution.

Definitions

Probability density function 
The Kaniadakis κ-Gamma distribution has the following probability density function:

 

The ordinary generalized Gamma distribution is recovered as : .

Cumulative distribution function 
The cumulative distribution function of κ-Gamma distribution assumes the form:

 

The cumulative Generalized Gamma distribution is recovered in the classical limit .

Properties

Moments and mode 
The κ-Gamma distribution has moment of order  given by

The mode is given by:

Asymptotic behavior 
The κ-Gamma distribution behaves asymptotically as follows:

Related distributions
The κ-Gamma distributions is a generalization of:
κ-Exponential distribution of type I, when ;
Kaniadakis κ-Erlang distribution, when  and  positive integer.
A κ-Gamma distribution corresponds to several probability distributions when , such as:
Gamma distribution, when ;
Exponential distribution, when ;
Erlang distribution, when  and  positive integer;
Chi-Squared distribution, when  and  half integer;
Chi distribution, when  and  half integer;

See also 

 Giorgio Kaniadakis
 Kaniadakis statistics
 Kaniadakis distribution
 Kaniadakis κ-Exponential distribution
 Kaniadakis κ-Gaussian distribution
 Kaniadakis κ-Weibull distribution
 Kaniadakis κ-Logistic distribution
 Kaniadakis κ-Erlang distribution

References

External links
Kaniadakis Statistics on arXiv.org

Statistics
Probability distributions
Continuous distributions
Survival analysis
Exponential family distributions
Infinitely divisible probability distributions